Painter's palette may refer to:

Palette (painting), the original sense of the phrase, a rigid, flat surface on which a painter arranges and mixes paints
The Painter's Palette, a 2003 album by Italian metal band Ephel Duath
Any of several species of Anthurium, a flowering plant genus in the arum family, including:
Anthurium andraeanum, commonly called painter's palette or flamingo flower, the most common referent of these names
Anthurium scherzerianum, also commonly called painter's palette or flamingo flower
A cultivar of Persicaria virginiana, a plant in the knotweed family
A cultivar of ''Begonia rex, a plant in the begonia family